Beatrice Foods Company was a major American food processing company founded in 1894. In 1987, its international food operations were sold to Reginald Lewis, a corporate attorney, creating TLC Beatrice International, after which the majority of its domestic (U.S.) brands and assets were acquired by KKR, with the bulk of its holdings sold off. By 1990, the remaining operations were ultimately acquired by ConAgra Foods.

History

Early years

1894-1912
The Beatrice Creamery Company was founded in 1894 by George Everett Haskell and William W. Bosworth, by leasing the factory of a bankrupt firm of the same name located in Beatrice, Nebraska. At the time, they purchased butter, milk, and eggs from local farmers and graded them for resale. They promptly began separating the butter themselves at their plant, making their own butter on site and packaging and distributing it under their own label. They devised special protective packages and distributed them to grocery stores and restaurants in their own wagons and through jobbers. To overcome the shortage of cream, the partners established skimming stations to which farmers delivered their milk to have the cream, used to make butter, separated from the milk. This led to the introduction of their unique credit program of providing farmers with cream separators so they could separate the milk on the farm and retain the skim milk for animal food. This enabled farmers to pay for the separators from the proceeds of their sales of cream. The program worked so well, the company sold more than 50,000 separators in Nebraska from 1895 to 1905. On March 1, 1905, the company was incorporated as the Beatrice Creamery Company of Iowa, with capital of $3,000,000. By the early 20th century, they were shipping dairy products across the United States, and by 1910 they operated nine creameries and three ice cream plants across the Great Plains.

1913-1955
In 1913 the company moved to Chicago, the center of the American food processing industry. In 1939, Beatrice Creamery Company purchased Blue Valley Creamery Company, the other Chicago-based dairy centralizer. This acquisition added at least 11 creameries from New York to South Dakota. Beatrice's 'Meadow Gold' brand was a household name in much of America by the beginning of World War II. In 1946, it changed its name to Beatrice Foods Co. Their sales doubled between 1945 and 1955, as the post-war baby boom created greater demand for milk products.

Major expansion years

Canada
From the late 1950s until the early 1970s, the company expanded into Canada and purchased a number of other food firms, leveraging its distribution network to profit from a more diverse array of food and consumer products. It became the owner of brands such as Avis Car Rental, Playtex, Shedd's, Tropicana, John Sexton & Co, Good & Plenty, and many others. Annual sales in 1984 were roughly $12 billion. 

Beatrice's Canadian subsidiary, Beatrice Foods Canada, was founded in 1969 and became legally separate from its parent firm in 1978.

1955-1975
In 1968, Sexton Foods was approached by Beatrice with an offer to purchase the John Sexton & Co. Beatrice was attracted to Sexton Quality Foods' distribution network, quality, variety of private-label products, specialized food offerings, sales force and profitability. Mack Sexton's initial response was no, but Beatrice Foods was very interested.  Eventually both parties reached an agreement.  Beatrice Foods increased the purchase price, pledged capital to expand Sexton Quality Foods' distribution network, pledged capital to introduce a new Sexton frozen product line, and pledged that the Sexton leadership would continue to lead and operate the company as a separate entity. On December 20, 1968, Beatrice acquired the business and assets of John Sexton & Co., exchanging about 375,000 shares of Beatrice's preferred convertible preference stock valued at $37,500,000. John Sexton & Co. became an independent division of Beatrice Foods, still led by Mack Sexton (son of Franklin), William Egan (son of Helen), and William Sexton (son of Sherman). Mack became a vice president of Beatrice and a Beatrice board member. John Sexton & Co put Beatrice Foods into the wholesale grocery business and Beatrice put John Sexton & Co. into the frozen foods business.  Beatrice's and the Sexton's leadership were interested in maximizing the investment in John Sexton & Co. by growing the company.

1976-1980
Wallace Rasmussen was CEO of Beatrice Foods from 1976 until 1980, retiring after 47 years with the company. During his tenure, Beatrice added several high-value acquisitions to its portfolio, most notably Tropicana Products, Inc.

Final decade

1981-1984
During both the 1984 Winter and Summer Olympics, the corporation flooded the TV airwaves with advertisements letting the public know that many brands with which they were familiar were actually part of Beatrice Foods. These ads used the tagline (with a jingle) "We're Beatrice. You've known us all along." After the Olympics, advertisements for its products continued to end with the catchphrase "We're Beatrice" and an instrumental version of the "You've known us all along" portion of the jingle, as the red and white "Beatrice" logo would simultaneously appear in the bottom right hand corner. The campaign was found to alienate consumers, as it called attention to the fact that many of their favorite brands were part of a far-reaching multinational corporation. One commercial also mispronounced the name of the founding city. The campaign was pulled off the air by autumn.

At the 87th annual Beatrice shareholders’ meeting on June 5, 1984, stockholders of record were asked to change the name of the company.  "Recognizing this clear departure from the past, we are proposing a new name for the company. At our annual meeting in June, stockholders will be asked to change the name to Beatrice Companies, Inc. from Beatrice Foods Co. This change is appropriate given the company's evolution and present composition. It reflects Beatrice's wide range of separate and distinct businesses, many with operations totally unrelated to food processing, yet retains the company's goodwill and reputation for quality products and services." Annual Report, February 29, 1984.

In June 1984, Beatrice acquired Esmark. The Esmark acquisition was part of the company's strategy to focus Beatrice's assets in food and consumer products businesses. In addition to the Swift & Co. and Hunt-Wesson food brands, companies owned by Esmark included Avis Rent a Car, Playtex, Jensen Electronics, and STP. Because of Esmark's national brands, direct sales force, distribution network and research and development capabilities, its acquisition was expected to accelerate the attainment of Beatrice's marketing goals. The company also sought a higher public profile, adding their name to the end of their brands' television commercials, and sponsoring the Newman-Haas IndyCar and Haas Lola Formula One racing teams. Many analysts believe the Esmark acquisition, which was pushed by then Chairman, Chief Executive Officer and President James L. Dutt, put too much of a debt load on Beatrice, which hurt Beatrice's credit rating and therefore deflated the value of Beatrice stock.

1985-1986
1985, Beatrice sold their Beatrice Chemical division to Imperial Chemical Industries. Stahl Finish, Paule Chemical, Polyvinyl Chemical Industries, Converters Ink Company, and Thoro System Products were the business units that formed Beatrice Chemical. Other divisions sold to pay off the debt from the Esmark purchase included Brillion Iron Works, World Dryer, STP, and Buckingham Wine (distributors of Cutty Sark whisky).

In 1986, Beatrice became the target of leveraged buyout specialists KKR and they ultimately purchased the firm for $8.7 billion. At the time this was the largest leveraged buyout in history — and over the next four years it was sold off, division by division.

Beatrice's Coca-Cola bottling operations (acquired by Beatrice in 1981) were acquired by The Coca-Cola Company for $1 billion
in 1986. They were shortly spun off as Coca-Cola Enterprises Beatrice Bottled Water Division (acquired with the Coca-Cola operations) with brands such as Arrowhead Drinking Water, Ozarka Drinking Water, and Great Bear Drinking Water were also sold to Perrier in 1987.

In December 1986, a group of Company executives, together with Drexel Burnham Lambert bought International Playtex, Inc. in a leveraged buyout and named the newly private organization Playtex Holdings.  Playtex included such former Esmark brands as Max Factor, Playtex Living Gloves, Playtex Products, Almay, Jhirmack, and Halston/Orlane.

The Beatrice Dairy Products subsidiary, which included the brands of Meadow Gold, Hotel Bar Butter, Keller's Butter, Mountain High Yogurt, and Viva Milk Products, to Borden, Inc. in December 1986 for $315,000,000.

Other divisions sold in 1986 included Americold and Danskin.

1987-1990
Brands like Samsonite, Culligan, Stiffel Lamps, del mar window coverings, Louver Drape window coverings, Aristokraft kitchen cabinets, Day-Timer planner, Waterloo Industries tool boxes, Aunt Nellies and Martha White were merged into a new entity called E-II Holdings, which was later purchased by American Brands for 1.14 billion. E-II was created in June, 1987, as an umbrella company for several non-food and specialty food businesses of Beatrice. Meshulam Riklis bought E-II from American Brands in 1988; American Brands bought back Aristokraft, Day-Timer, Waterloo, Twentieth Century and Vogel Peterson.

Tropicana Products was sold to Seagram for $1.2 billion in 1988.

All of the international operations were folded into a new entity called Beatrice International Holdings in 1987, which was later purchased that year through junk bond financing for $985 million by Reginald Lewis, a corporate attorney, creating TLC Beatrice International. TLC Beatrice International became the largest business in America owned by an African American and the first company to reach a billion dollars in sales, with a black man at its head. TLC Beatrice sold the Canadian operations; Beatrice Foods Canada, Ltd., in 1990 to Onyx and then Beatrice Foods later ended up in the hands of Parmalat in 1997.

In 1987, KKR had formed a new entity, with similar intent as E-II Holdings, called Beatrice Company, which was specifically created to include Beatrice Cheese, Beatrice-Hunt/Wesson, and Swift-Eckrich.  In 1990, KKR sold Beatrice Company to Conagra Brands. Most of Beatrice's brand names still exist, but under various other owners, as trademarks and product lines were sold separately to the highest bidder.

Controversies
Through the 1980s, Beatrice was a co-defendant alongside W.R. Grace and Company in a lawsuit alleging that the Riley Tannery, a division of Beatrice Foods, had dumped toxic waste which contaminated an underground aquifer that supplied drinking water to East Woburn, Massachusetts. The case became the subject of the popular book and film A Civil Action. Federal judge Walter Jay Skinner ruled that Beatrice was not responsible for the contamination, although according to the book and film, based on new evidence brought forward by the EPA later found, Judge Skinner reversed his verdict and found both companies responsible.

In the 1980s, the firm operated in South Africa during apartheid. As a private company, the campaign of divestment could not lower its stock price and thus had no impact on its business activities.

Current era
The original Beatrice Companies (Beatrice Foods Co. before 1984, and Beatrice Creamery Company before 1946) went dormant in the late 1980s, but was revived in 2007. The Beatrice of today goes by its 1984 name of Beatrice Companies, which was approved by the 1984 stockholder meeting.

Former Beatrice brands 

 Absopure distilled and spring water
 Accurate Threaded Fasteners
 Acryon leisure and household products
 Advanced Nutrition Formula|Agri-Products
 A.H.Schwab children's play products
 A.J. ten|Doesschate, Holland
 Airstream
 Allison leisure apparel
 All-Pro leisure apparel
 Altoids
 American Hostess ice cream
 American Pickles
 Antoine's food products
 Aqua Queen garden equipment
 Argosy recreational vehicles
 Arist O' Kraft cabinets
 Armitage Realty Co.
 Arrowhead Water
 Assumption Abbey wine products
 Aunt Nellie's food products
 Avan recreational vehicles
 Avis
 Banner painting equipment
 Barbara Dee cookies
 Barcrest beverage mixes
 Beatreme dairy products and flavorings
 Beatrice dairy products
 Becky Kay's cookies
 Beefbreak meat specialties
 Beeforcan meat specialties
 Beneke bathroom accessories
 Best Jet painting equipment
 Bickford food products
 Bighorn specialty meats
 Big Pete specialty meats
 Bireley's orange drink (Asahi Soft Drinks)
 Bloomfield Industries
 Blue Ribbon condiments
 Blue Valley Creamery Company
 Body Shaper plumbing supplies
 Bogene closet accessories
 Boizet specialty food products
 Bonanza mini-motorhomes
 Binkers cat treats
 Bosman barbecue equipment
 Bowers candies
 Bredan butter
 Brenner candy
 Brillion Iron Works
 Brookside wine products
 Brown Miller condiments
 Brown 'N Serve
 Bubble Stream plumbing equipment
 Burny Bros. Bakery
 Butterball
 Butterchef Bakery
 Buttercrust baked goods
 Buxton leather accessories
 Byrons barbecue
 California Products beverage mixes
 Campus Casuals sport clothing
 Captain Kids food products
 Cartwheels travel bags
 CCA Furniture accessories
 Chapelcord school and religious apparel
 Charmglow barbecue grills and outdoor products
 Checkers beverages
 Chicago red wine products
 Chicago specialty plumbing tools and supplies
 Churngold condiments
 Cincinnati Fruit condiments and fountain syrups
 Citro Crest beverage mixes
 Clark candy
 Classic travel bags
 Classy Crisps
 Colonial Cookie|Canada
 Colorado By-Products|Agri-Products
 Converts Ink CONCO
 Cremo Limited|Jamaica
 Cook n' Cajun barbecue equipment
 Costello's food products
 Country Hearth baked goods
 County Line cheeses
 Cow Boy Jo's meat specialities
 Culligan
 C.W. pickles
 Dannon yogurt
 Day-Timers
 Eckrich
 E.R. Moore Co.
 Etablissements Baud|Paris, France
 Farboil Paint Co.
 Fibreite Composites
 Franprix
 Gebhardt Mexican foods
 Geerpres
 Good & Plenty
 Harman Kardon
 Hart Skis
 Helados Calatayud|Spain
 Henry Berry & Co|Australia
 Hunt's
 Imperial Oil & Grease
 JH Rhodes
 Jolly Rancher
 Kalise Menorquina
 Kobey's
 Krispy Kreme
 La Choy
 Lakeview Pure Milk, Ltd.
 Little Brownie cookies
 LouverDrape
 Ma Brown jams, jellies, pickles
 Mario olives
 Market Forge Industries Inc.
 Martha White
 Melnor
 Meadow Gold
 Mid-America Container
 Milk Duds
 Monson Printing & Monroe Paper Company
 Morgan Yacht Company
 Mrs. Leland's Candy
 Now and Later
 Orville Redenbacher's
 The Ozarka Spring Water Company
 Patra Holdings Pty., Ltd.|Australia
 Pauly of Wisconsin
 Peter Pan
 Pfister & Vogel
 Pik-Nik
 Playtex
 Polyvinyl Chemical Group
 Premier Ice Cream Co.|Denmark
 Red Tulip|Australia
 Regal Packer By-Products|Agri-Products
 Rosarita
 Rudolph Foods
 Rusty Jones
 Samsonite
 Sanson Gelati, S.p.A.|Verona, Italy
 Sap's Donuts
 Sexton Foods
 Shedd's
 Snowco
 Soup Starter
 Stahl Finish
 Stiffel Lamps
 Swift Ice Cream
 Swift's Premium
 Swiss Miss
 Switzer licorice
 Taylor Freezer Corporation
 Termicold
 THORO|Weatherproofing products
 Treasure Cave
 Tropicana
 Utah By-Products|Agri-Products
 V-H Quality Foods|Canada
 Vigortone|Agri-Products
 Vogel-Peterson
 Wells Manufacturing
 Western By-Products|Agri-Products
 Waterloo Industries, Inc.
 Wesson
 World Dryer hand dryers

Beatrice Foods Canada

Beatrice Foods Canada is a Toronto, Ontario-based dairy unit of Parmalat Canada. The Canadian unit of Beatrice Foods was founded in 1969, and was separated from Beatrice Foods in 1978.

Consequently, Beatrice's Canadian unit was not affected by the buyout of its founders and remained in business as one of Canada's largest food processing concerns.

In 1997 Beatrice Foods Canada was acquired by Parmalat. At first, Parmalat dropped the Beatrice name from the company's products, but reinstated it in late 2005, while the Italian parent company was being investigated.

See also 
 Lee Archer, head of North Street Capital Corporation and Archer Asset Management
 A Civil Action
 List of defunct consumer brands

References

External links 
 Parmalat Canada
 Beatrice Canada
 Beatrice Companies, Inc.
 Beatrice Archives
 Meadow Gold History

Food and drink companies established in 1894
Food and drink companies disestablished in 1990
Defunct manufacturing companies based in California
Defunct consumer brands
Dairy products companies of the United States
Dairy products companies of Canada
Defunct food and drink companies of Canada
Food and drink companies based in California
Kohlberg Kravis Roberts companies
Lactalis
Private equity portfolio companies
Condiment companies of the United States
Conagra Brands
1894 establishments in Nebraska
1990 disestablishments in California
1990 mergers and acquisitions